Thomas Dieter Dirk Hoffman MBE LLB FCA (born August 1945) is a councilman of the City of London Corporation, where he represents the ward of Vintry.

Early life and career
Hoffman was educated at St John's College School and The Leys School, Cambridge. He read law at the University of Exeter. He is a Fellow of the Institute of Chartered Accountants in England & Wales, and had a career in banking until his retirement in 2003.

Offices
He was elected to the Court of Common Council in 2002. He is a governor of the Museum of London, the Barbican Centre, the City of London School for Girls (and former chairman). He was a governor of King's College Hospital, and since 2012 has been a governor of Guy's & St Thomas Hospital. He was a member of the Council of the University of Exeter, governor of Birkbeck College of which he is an Honorary Fellow, chairman of the Guildhall School of Music & Drama, chairman of the board of the London Festival Orchestra, and  almoner and governor of Christ's Hospital.

Guilds
Hoffman is a member of the Court of the Tylers' and Bricklayers' Company of which he was master in 2006/7. He is honorary treasurer of the Guildhall Historical Association which published his paper on The Rise & Decline of Guilds in Great Britain and Ireland. He compiled a four volume Bibliography on the Guilds of Great Britain and Ireland which is published on the website of Birkbeck College.

References 

Living people
Councilmen and Aldermen of the City of London
1945 births
English accountants
People educated at The Leys School
Alumni of the University of Exeter
English bankers
Guilds in England